The London-based The BibleCode Sundays are a band often described as Celtic rock, folk music or rock music. Their sound fuses influences from a mixture of traditional Irish instruments and contemporary rock back line.

History 
The band was originally named "Slainte". In 2006, they release an album BibleCodeSundays of traditional Irish songs. The album name referred to the Bible code and other conspiracy theories they discussed in the drink-fueled conversations regularly held after Sunday gigs. The band later  changed their name to "The BibleCode Sundays". Slainte were voted "Best Band on the London Circuit" 2006 in The Irish World awards.

In 2007, the band returned to the studio to record a second album, of original material. Ghosts of our past, at Panic studios, Park Royal. They signed to the "cosmic trigger" label in New York whilst on tour there promoting the album, and had several tours to the States afterwards. In 2008, the band recorded Boots or no Boots touring extensively in Europe and the US to promote the album.

Following the success of both albums, the band played at the Glastonbury festival, at Celtic Park in Glasgow before several Glasgow Celtic F.C. matches and were the guest band on Sky Sports Soccer Saturday Christmas Special in a spoof of the X Factor programme called the Y factor. The band supported The Dropkick Murphy's at their homecoming gig in Boston on St. Patrick's day 2009. The band supported Van Morrison & Thin Lizzy at the London Feis in June 2011.

In 2011, the band released their EP The Pittsburgh Kid, followed on 22 November 2013, by their third album New Hazardous Design. In Spring 2014, they recorded Live Near Abbey Road.

"Count Your Blessings", a track off the New Hazardous Design album, was used on the Epix TV series Get Shorty. "Boys of Queens" was also used as an epilogue in the US TV series Unforgettable.

In 2015, the band twice supported PiL at the O2 Indigo Arena in London.

In September 2017 the band released Walk Like Kings with special guests including Ronan MacManus's half-brother Elvis Costello, Russell Crowe and Matt McManamon (the Dead 60's & the Specials). Other guests include Lorraine O'Reilly, Elly O'Keeffe, Keelta Higgins on vocals, with Tony Rico Richardson, Brian Kelly and Patrick Cassidy guest musicians. The album is described as an "accidental album" as the band used up a collection of old songs and a number of new to complete the project. Described in style as an eclectic group of songs driven by the different musical tastes within the band.

Tragedy struck the band on 3 November 2017 following the sudden death of drummer Carlton Hunt.

On 14 January 2019, the band announced that lead singer Ronan MacManus was leaving the band to pursue a "quieter more family orientated life"

Line up 
 Paddy Franklin – Fiddle
 Enda Mulloy – Bass and vocals
 Andy Nolan – Accordion
 Kian Chanter – Lead Guitar and vocals
 Joe Cotterill – Drums

Discography 
 Ghosts of our Past – 2006
 Boots or No Boots – 2007
 The Pittsburgh Kid EP – 2011
 New Hazardous Design 2013
 Live Near Abbey Road 2014
 Walk Like Kings 2017

References 

English rock music groups
Celtic fusion groups
Celtic rock music